Colonel Robert Angus Keane  (14 May 1914 – 16 August 1977) was a Canadian military officer and commander who served with the Canadian Army in both World War II and the Korean War.

Career 
First enlisting at age 15 in the Canadian Militia, Keane was commissioned in 1935 as a Lieutenant with The Lake Superior Regiment. Already a captain and the LSR's Adjutant at the start of World War II, Keane was mobilized for active service along with the rest of regiment. Promoted to major and serving as the LSR's second in command when the regiment was sent to Normandy after the Normandy landings, Keane was promoted to lieutenant colonel and commanded the Lake Superior Regiment (Motor) from August 1944 until the end of the war in May 1945. He joined the Regular Force after the war, Keane served with the Directorate of Military Operations and Plans at the National Defence Headquarters. When the Korean War broke out, he was personally chosen to command the Royal Canadian Regiment for service with the 25th Canadian Infantry Brigade in Korea. After commanding 2RCR in Korea, Keane returned to Canada and promoted to the rank of colonel, serving in various senior capacities until retiring from the army in 1965.

Later Life 
Keane died from cancer in Thunder Bay in 1977 at age 63.

References 
 Bercuson, David J, Blood On The Hills: The Canadian Army In The Korean War, Toronto Buffalo London, University of Toronto Press, 1999

1914 births
1977 deaths
Lake Superior Scottish Regiment
Canadian Army personnel of World War II
Royal Canadian Regiment officers
Canadian military personnel of the Korean War
Canadian Companions of the Distinguished Service Order
Canadian Army officers
Canadian Militia officers
People from Thunder Bay
Canadian military personnel from Ontario